Christopher Condent (fl. 1710s), born in Plymouth in Devon, was an English pirate who led the return to the Eastern Seas.

Career
Christopher Condent's real name is uncertain. He has been known under the surnames Condent, Congdon, Coudon, Connor or Condell; various given names also arise, including William, Christopher, Edmond, Edward, or John. He is often known as Christopher Condent, but perhaps most commonly known simply as "Billy One-Hand".

During a trip across the Atlantic Ocean, Condent killed an Indian crewmember, who threatened to ignite the ship's powder magazine. Shortly after, the ship captured a merchantman, the Duke of York. After a dispute, the crew split up between the two ships, with Condent elected captain of the sloop.

Around 1718, when Woodes Rogers became governor of the Bahamas, and was tasked with ridding the Caribbean of pirates, Condent and his crew left New Providence. At the Cape Verde Islands, Condent and his men captured a ship carrying Portuguese wine. Condent then sailed to Brazil, where he took more prizes, occasionally cutting off the ears and noses of Portuguese prisoners. He then returned to the area around Cape Verde, where he captured a flotilla of twenty small ships and a Dutch war sloop off Santiago. Condent kept the warship, and named it The Fiery Dragon.

Condent seized the English galley, the Wright, a Portuguese ship, and a 26-gun Dutch vessel. Leaving the Wright behind, he led a fleet of three ships to the Gold Coast (Ghana) where they captured the Indian Queen, the Fame, and another Dutch ship.

By April 1719, Condent had reached Madagascar and established a base at Sainte-Marie. There he integrated some of John Halsey's old crew into his own. He used their knowledge of the area to his advantage as he cruised the Indian Coast and the Red Sea in search of more plunder. Other pirates, namely Edward England and John Taylor aboard their ship the Pearl, followed Condent from New Providence to Madagascar.

In an attempt not to further enrage the East India Company, Condent's crew were ordered not to abuse crew members or passengers. By then the permanent presence of the Royal Navy, in the Indian Ocean, increased the risks substantially.

Condent and his crew returned to the island of Sainte-Marie, dividing their haul into around £3,000 each. In 1721 Condent and forty other members of his crew sailed to the island of Bourbon where they negotiated with the French governor for a pardon.  Twenty or more of the men settled on the island. Condent went on to marry the governor's sister-in-law, and in 1723 travelled to France, where he settled down with his wife in Brittany and became a wealthy merchant in Saint-Malo.

At first thought to be William Kidd's Adventure Galley, the Fiery Dragon was claimed to have been found by Barry Clifford off the coast of Sainte-Marie, Madagascar, where it had caught fire and sunk in 1721. However, a UNESCO analysis of Clifford's discovery reported that Clifford had instead found an unrelated ship of Asian origin.

Flag

The Jolly Roger flag generally associated with Condent - three skulls-and-crossbones on a black flag or banner - first appeared in Mariner's Mirror in 1912, though it was not attributed to Condent and was dated to 1704. A similar design was printed in Basil Lubbock's “Blackwall Frigates” in 1922 and F. Bradlee's "Piracy in the West Indies and its suppression” in 1923, again not attributed to Condent. Charles Grey attributed it to him in 1933 in “Pirates of the Eastern Seas” but without citing any evidence. There are no period sources describing his flag.

References

External links
Christopher Condent at Rob Ossian's Pirate Cove!

Further reading

1690s births
1770 deaths
British pirates
People from Plymouth, Devon
Pardoned pirates